Jaime Moreira Pacheco (born 22 July 1958) is a Portuguese former footballer who played as a central midfielder, currently manager of Egyptian Premier League club Pyramids FC.

During his career he played, among others, for Porto and Sporting CP, amassing Primeira Liga totals of 296 matches and 19 goals over 15 seasons. Subsequently, he worked as a manager for several clubs for more than two decades, including Boavista which he led to its only league title.

A Portugal international on 25 occasions, Pacheco represented the country at the 1986 World Cup and Euro 1984.

Playing career

Club
Born in Paredes, Pacheco arrived at FC Porto from lowly Aliados do Lordelo FC, then in the second division. He eventually consolidated himself in the team's starting XI, playing more than 100 competitive matches during his first spell.

In the summer of 1984, Pacheco signed with another Primeira Liga club, Sporting CP, moving alongside teammate António Sousa as part of the deal that sent 17-year-old prodigy Paulo Futre in the opposite direction. The pair returned after two seasons, proceeding to win the European Cup, the Intercontinental Cup and the UEFA Super Cup whilst appearing regularly (Sousa more than Pacheco).

Pacheco joined Vitória F.C. aged 31, playing two seasons with both them and F.C. Paços de Ferreira and another with S.C. Braga – always in the top flight – retiring at the end of 1995 with amateurs U.S.C. Paredes.

International
Pacheco made his debut for the Portugal national team on 23 February 1983, in a 1–0 friendly win over West Germany. In the following seven years, he won a further 24 caps without scoring.

Pacheco represented the nation at both UEFA Euro 1984 and the 1986 FIFA World Cup, both as a leading player. After a four-year absence he made his final appearance, playing in a 0–0 Euro 1992 qualifier against Finland, on 12 September 1990.

Coaching career
Pacheco took up coaching while still an active footballer, starting with Paços Ferreira. In early 1994 he left Braga (as a player), and returned to the former in the same capacity. In a similar move, he would again act as player-coach, now at Rio Ave FC, and leave Paredes for Vitória S.C. midway through the 1995–96 season, after which he concentrated solely on management; also with the Minho side, he managed a fifth place in the 1996–97 campaign and a third in the following.

Pacheco was responsible for Boavista FC's greatest ever success, the league championship in 2001, followed by a participation in the second group stage of the UEFA Champions League and a 2002–03 UEFA Cup semi-final run. These achievements prompted the interest of La Liga club RCD Mallorca in June 2003, but he was dismissed in September after just five matches and one win, immediately returning to Boavista as a replacement for sacked Erwin Sánchez, whom he had previously managed there.

Following a poor run of results, Pacheco stood down in April 2005. He was then contracted by Vitória Guimarães but resigned in December, after which he again moved to his main club.

Pacheco was at Boavista's helm when the Porto team were relegated to division two at the end of the 2007–08 season, due to the Apito Dourado affair. He then signed with C.F. Os Belenenses, but left by mutual agreement in May 2009 as the Lisbon side were eventually relegated – later reinstated.

Pacheco joined Al Shabab FC (Riyadh) in 2009, winning the Prince Faisal bin Fahad Cup almost immediately. However, following a 0–1 group stage loss against Iran's Sepahan F.C. for the campaign's AFC Champions League on 15 April 2010, he was relieved of his duties.

In December 2010, Pacheco was signed by Beijing Guoan F.C. of the Chinese Super League on a year-long contract. In June of the following year, during a match against Tianjin Teda F.C. at Workers Stadium, he erected his middle finger to the referee and the opposite team, being punished with an eight-match suspension and a €4,265 fine by the Chinese Football Association.

Pacheco moved to the third continent of his career in October 2014, when he was appointed at Egypt's Zamalek SC as a replacement for the dismissed Hossam Hassan. At the turn of the new year, he unexpectedly quit the league leaders to return to Al-Shabab; he had a record of eight wins and a draw from ten games and felt disrespected by the club's board. His second spell in Riyadh lasted just until March 2015, when he left by mutual consent to deal with undisclosed personal issues at home.

In August 2016, Pacheco returned to China's top flight by agreeing to a one-year deal with Tianjin Teda. Having completed his goal of keeping them in the league that year, he left the next May after a five-game winless run in the opening stages of the following campaign.

Pacheco returned to Zamalek on 23 September 2020. On 12 March 2021, he was dismissed. 

On 5 January 2023, Pacheco took over Pyramids FC also in the Egyptian Premier League.

Managerial statistics

Honours

Player
Porto
Primeira Liga: 1987–88
Taça de Portugal: 1983–84, 1987–88
Supertaça Cândido de Oliveira: 1981, 1983, 1986
European Cup: 1986–87
Intercontinental Cup: 1987
UEFA Super Cup: 1987

Manager
Boavista
Primeira Liga: 2000–01

Al Shabab
Saudi Federation Cup: 2009–10

References

External links

1958 births
Living people
People from Paredes, Portugal
Sportspeople from Porto District
Portuguese footballers
Association football midfielders
Primeira Liga players
Liga Portugal 2 players
FC Porto players
Sporting CP footballers
Vitória F.C. players
F.C. Paços de Ferreira players
S.C. Braga players
Rio Ave F.C. players
U.S.C. Paredes players
Portugal international footballers
UEFA Euro 1984 players
1986 FIFA World Cup players
Portuguese football managers
Primeira Liga managers
Liga Portugal 2 managers
F.C. Paços de Ferreira managers
Rio Ave F.C. managers
Vitória S.C. managers
Boavista F.C. managers
C.F. Os Belenenses managers
La Liga managers
RCD Mallorca managers
Saudi Professional League managers
Al Shabab FC (Riyadh) managers
Chinese Super League managers
Beijing Guoan F.C. managers
Tianjin Jinmen Tiger F.C. managers
Egyptian Premier League managers
Zamalek SC managers
Pyramids FC managers
Portuguese expatriate football managers
Expatriate football managers in Spain
Expatriate football managers in Saudi Arabia
Expatriate football managers in China
Expatriate football managers in Egypt
Portuguese expatriate sportspeople in Spain
Portuguese expatriate sportspeople in Saudi Arabia
Portuguese expatriate sportspeople in China
Portuguese expatriate sportspeople in Egypt